Nottinghamshire Deaf Society is based at a Victorian building on Forest Road West in Nottingham.  It is a Grade II listed building and was built in the 1860s, when it was the home of the Nottingham Congregational Institute.

External links
 Official website

Organisations based in Nottinghamshire
Deaf culture in the United Kingdom
Schools for the deaf in the United Kingdom
Education in Nottingham